Association football has been a part of Basque Country culture since the end of the 19th century. As of 2021, three Basque teams play in La Liga, the top division of the Spanish football system: Athletic Bilbao, Real Sociedad and Deportivo Alavés.

History

Early years
Modern football was introduced to the Basque Country in the late 19th century by a combination of mostly British immigrant workers, visiting sailors and Spanish students returning from Britain. In the late 1870s, various English workers scattered throughout the peninsula began to establish informal groups that were dedicated to different recreational practices, especially cricket and football, particularly in Spanish ports, such as the ones in Vigo, Andalusia, (Huelva and Seville) and Bilbao, who were the regions that most felt this phenomenon. The latter was a leading port of an important industrial area with iron mines and shipyards nearby. Likewise, it was the British employees of the Nervión Shipyards, located in Sestao (Vizcaya), who organized and played the first known football match in the region, which was held on 4 April 1890, between the Machinery Department (engineers) and the Shipyard Workers, ending in an 8–1 to the former. This group of football pioneers were part of a multi-sports club called Club Atleta, which had been founded in late 1889.

These first football meetings were held on the quay next to the riverbank of Nervión, also known as La Campa de los Ingleses, and it was on this field that Club Atleta began to play against crews of English ships coming from Portsmouth and Southampton, and even a new team, the Bilbao Football Club, which was also made up of British residents in the region, but not linked to the shipyards, such as Alfred Mills, who was a telegraph operator. By 1892 the sheer quantity of Englishmen playing football on La Campa de los Ingleses forced them to seek another pitch that could properly accommodate the growing population of Brits, and so, in November 1892, the president of Club Atleta, Enrique Jones Bird, asked for permission to play in the Hippodrome of Lamiako. Permission was duly granted and the racetrack became the new home of organised football in Viscaya. It was from Lamiako that the sport of football took off in Bilbao, with several Bilbainos swarming the field to watch the teams of British workers challenge each other every weekend, and there is even evidence of a "serious" tournament in the winter of 1892–93, which was contested in Lamiako by Club Atleta and Bilbao FC, and won by the former, who received medals presented by James S. Clark on 22 April 1893.

Interest in the sport continued to grow among the local citizens, who began to practice it, and they even went as far as to challenge the British team in 1894 to a match at Lamiako, and naturally, the much advanced British won by a resounding score (0–5), but the result did not discourage the enthusiastic locals who were quick to play another match as the sport was sparking high interest in the area. In fact, shortly after the match, some young people from the Gimnásio Zamacois in Bilbao, began to play football games in Lamiako, and in 1898, seven football enthusiasts belonging to the Zamacois gym founded Athletic Club. Two years later, Carlos Castellanos and his brother Manuel, together with a group of young Bilbainos from the upper class who had studied in England and learned about football there, founded the Bilbao Football Club (not related with the Bilbao club that existed in 1892–93, formed by the British) on 30 November 1900 in the Biscayan neighborhood of Algorta. Among them was Santiago Martínez de las Rivas, the son of José Martínez Rivas, the owner of the Nervión Shipyards.

The new Bilbao FC was officially established shortly after its foundation since its regulations were approved by the civil governor and printed in 1901. A few months later, in February 1901, Athletic Club, probably encouraged by the first news about the founding of Bilbao FC, began conversations to officially establish the club, which they did on 5 September 1901, in the infamous meeting held in the Café García, in which the 33 members decided to make it official and register as a sports organization with the local council. While Athletic Club was mainly formed by local players, having only one foreigner in its ranks, Alfred Mills, Bilbao FC was mostly made up by foreigners, such as Walter Evans, George Langford, William Dyer, and George Cockram. At the end of 1901, the two most important clubs in the city were Athletic Club and Bilbao FC, and naturally, a rivalry soon arose between the two Bilbao teams, who played several friendlies at Lamiako, which the two teams shared since there were hardly any fields in Bilbao. Their duels aroused great expectation and served as one of the drivers of football as a mass phenomenon in Bilbao. In 1902, the two rivals agreed to join the best players of each club to play two games against the Bordeaux-based side Burdigala, beating them 0–2 in France, the first time a Bilbao team played on foreign territory, and 7–0 in Lamiako, the very first visit by a foreign team to Bilbao, gathering a crowd of three thousand spectators, a tremendous amount at the time.

This temporary merge became known as Club Bizcaya (with a B), and following an invitation from Madrid FC (now known as Real Madrid), Club Bizcaya was sent to Madrid to represent the city of Bilbao in the 1902 Copa de la Coronación, with the then Athletic president, Juan Astorquia, being named the team's captain. This entity played and won three games on consecutive days, and then the title after beating the Catalan club, FC Barcelona, in the final, by a score of 2 goals to 1, netted by Astorquia and the French Armand Cazeaux, both of Athletic. In March 1903, Bilbao FC could not keep an independent structure and ended up being absorbed by Athletic Club and the side that emerged from the unification was called Athletic Club de Bilbao.

In addition to Athletic and Bilbao FC, more teams were founded such as San Sebastián Recreation Club in 1903, the first club in San Sebastián, followed by Vasconia and Real Sociedad, and Irun FC in 1906, who later changed its name to Irún Sporting Club. An internal division split the team in 1908 and Racing Club Irún appeared. This local rivalry was very strong in such a small town, but the success of these teams was important. Both clubs merged later in 1915.
Another important club that deserves a mention is Arenas FC (later Arenas de Getxo), founded in 1909 and located in Bizcaia, thus being the main threat for Athletic Club in the 1910s.

With the game becoming increasingly popular, the indigenous game of Basque pelota would soon come under threat, so much so that the Atotxa Stadium in San Sebastián forced nearby pelota courts to be demolished in order to make way for renovations, or more specifically, increase the capacity to 20,000. Alongside the development of football was the introduction of Basque nationalism by Sabino Arana, considered by some as the founding "father". Arana was involved in the creation of the flag, anthem, and ultimately the Basque Nationalist Party (Partido Nacionalista Vasco, PNV). Football and Basque nationalism are closely knitted throughout history and would go through significant historical events such as the Spanish Civil War, and the creation of Francoist Spain. In the time after, Basque football was dragged through politics, with locals banned from showing autonomy, and the Basque Country national football team playing a few games during the 36-year dictatorship. As time went on, the Basque Football Federation would come into inception in 1988.

Recent years
In the early 21st century, Basque football is represented by many clubs old and new, some of them holding a strong presence in the Spanish top division La Liga, including Athletic Bilbao (who have played there on a constant basis since its formation in 1928 and been champions eight times, plus 23 Copa del Rey wins and two UEFA Cup / Europa League finals), Real Sociedad (present in all but a handful of seasons, champions twice and Copa winners three times, including 2020 which was a Basque derby between Athletic and Real), Deportivo Alavés (somewhat intermittent members of the top division but with strong periods and a UEFA Cup final appearance in 2001) and SD Eibar (from 2014 to 2021, characterised as one of the smallest clubs to take part at that level).

Basque Country national team 
 
The Basque Country national football team (Euskal selekzioa) selects players from the Greater Basque region comprising the Basque Autonomous Community (Biscay, Álava and Gipuzkoa) plus neighbouring Navarre – the historical home of the Basque people but in modern times has a distinct identity which is only partly Basque, and home to CA Osasuna at club level – within Spain, and the three small provinces making up the Northern Basque Country in France, a territory where rugby union is very popular but has produced some talented players. The representative team is run by the Basque Football Federation. Since its inception in 1930, the team went through a series of names, was organised under exile in Latin America with some of the region's leading players of the time during the Civil War, and only played twice under Franco's dictatorship. After his death in 1975, The team was up and running again, playing 26 friendly games so far against countries from around the world associated with FIFA – however they themselves are not connected to FIFA.

Youth football 
Youth football in the region (overseen by both the Basque Federation) has its own traditions and advanced style of play. Many youth teams are taught to play with possession-based style and quick thinking. Another unique aspect in the region is the emphasis that is placed on producing local talent, with Real Sociedad and Athletic Bilbao assessed as consistently using the highest proportion of homegrown players across the top European football leagues in the 2010s. Most of Real's players are Gipuzkoa locals from their academy, while Athletic's 100-year-old official signing policy limits themselves to players from the Greater Basque region (either born there, raised there i.e. received coaching at a local club including their own youth academy, or occasionally due to family ties, although they have never signed an established professional player on this more tenuous basis). Athletic Bilbao are highly regarded due to their ability to compete against the biggest teams like Real Madrid, Atlético Madrid, and FC Barcelona over several decades despite this restriction and commitment to local young players. With the Basque representative team organised on only an occasional, unofficial basis, the region has provided a long list of players for the Spanish national team throughout its history, particularly in the early decades of the 20th century when a high proportion of the top players across the whole league were Basque due to the sport's popularity in the region, but also in subsequent periods due to the focus on homegrown talent by the major clubs (although this is  true to a certain extent across Spain, with all the leading teams using a long-established cantera system of youth development).

Clubs (excluding reserve and woman's sections)

Defunct Clubs (including reserve teams)

See also 
 Basque football derbies 
 :Category:Football in the Basque Country (autonomous community)
 List of Basque footballers

References 

Basque sport
Football in the Basque Country (autonomous community)